The Montenegrin Football Championship (Montenegrin: Prvijenstvo Crne Gore) was a football league competition that existed in the Kingdom of Serbs, Croats and Slovenes and Kingdom of Yugoslavia from 1925 until 1940, under the names Prvijenstvo Zetske i Primorske banovine (1922-1930) and Prvijenstvo Cetinjskog nogometnog podsaveza (1930-1940).

From 1922 to 1930, the championship was the third level of football in the Kingdom of Yugoslavia. In period 1930-1940, Montenegrin Football Championship, under the Cetinjski nogometni podsavez (Cetinje Football Association) was the second-tier league competition in the Kingdom of Yugoslavia.

Champions

Champions by seasons

Prvijenstvo Zetske i Primorske banovine (1922-1930)
In period 1922-1930, Championship of Montenegro (Prvijenstvo Zetske i Primorske banovine) was the third-tier competition in the Kingdom of Yugoslavia. It was organised by Splitski nogometni podsavez (regional association with the seat in Split). During every year, two seasons were played (spring and autumn).

Prvijenstvo Cetinjskog nogometnog podsaveza (1930-1940)
In period 1930-1940, Championship of the Cetinje Football Subassociation (Prvijenstvo Cetinjskog nogometnog podsaveza) was the second-tier competition in the Kingdom of Yugoslavia. It was organised by Cetinjski nogometni podsavez (regional association with the seat in Cetinje).

Sources:

Titles by team

See also
Montenegrin clubs in Yugoslav football competitions (1946-2006)
Football in Montenegro
Montenegrin First Leaguekomovi

References

Football leagues in Montenegro
Football in Montenegro
Recurring sporting events established in 1922
1922 establishments in Montenegro